Carlo degli Ariosti (died 1532) was a Roman Catholic prelate who served as Bishop of Acerra (1527–1532).

Biography
On 28 January 1527, Carlo degli Ariosti was appointed during the papacy of Pope Clement VII as Bishop of Acerra.
He served as Bishop of Acerra until his death in 1532.

References

External links and additional sources
 (for Chronology of Bishops) 
 (for Chronology of Bishops) 

16th-century Italian Roman Catholic bishops
Bishops appointed by Pope Clement VII
1532 deaths